James Ambrose Johnson Jr. (February 1, 1948 – August 6, 2004), better known by his stage name Rick James, was an American singer-songwriter, musician and record producer. Born and raised in Buffalo, New York, James began his musical career in his teenage years. He was in various bands before entering the U.S. Navy Reserve to avoid being drafted into the army. In 1964, James deserted to Toronto, Canada, where he formed the rock band the Mynah Birds, who eventually signed a recording deal with Motown Records in 1966. James's career with the group halted after military authorities discovered his whereabouts and eventually convicted him of desertion related charges. He served several months in jail.  After being released, James moved to California, where he started a variety of rock and funk groups in the late 1960s and early 1970s.

After forming the locally popular Stone City Band in his hometown of Buffalo in 1977, James finally found success as a recording artist after signing with Motown's Gordy Records, releasing the album Come Get It! in 1978 which produced the hits "You & I" and "Mary Jane". In 1981, James released his most successful album, Street Songs, which included career-defining hits such as "Give It to Me Baby" and "Super Freak", the latter song becoming his biggest crossover single, mixing elements of funk, disco, rock and new wave. James was also known for his soulful ballads such as "Fire & Desire" and "Ebony Eyes". In addition, James also had a successful career as a songwriter and producer for other artists including Teena Marie, the Mary Jane Girls, the Temptations, Eddie Murphy and Smokey Robinson.

James's mainstream success had peaked by the release of his album Glow in 1985 and his appearance on the popular TV show, The A-Team. His subsequent album releases failed to sell as well as their predecessors. Rapper MC Hammer sampled James's "Super Freak" for his 1990 hit, "U Can't Touch This" which won Best R&B Song at the 1991 Grammy Awards. James received his only Grammy for composing the song. By the early 1990s, James's career was hampered by his drug addiction and he was embroiled with legal issues. In 1993, James was convicted for two separate instances of kidnapping and assaulting two different women while under the influence of crack cocaine, resulting in a three-year sentence at Folsom State Prison. James was released on parole in 1996 and released the album Urban Rapsody in 1997. James's health problems halted his career again after he had a mild stroke during a concert in 1998, and he announced a semi-retirement.

In 2004, James's career returned to mainstream pop culture after he appeared in an episode of Chappelle's Show. The segment involved a Charlie Murphy True Hollywood Stories–style skit that satirized James's wild lifestyle in the 1980s. This resulted in renewed interest in his music and that year he returned to perform on the road. James died later that year from heart failure at age 56. 

In November 2020, James's estate confirmed the sale of a 50% stake in his publishing and masters catalog to the Hipgnosis Songs Fund, founded by Canadian music industry executive and entrepreneur Merck Mercuriadis.

Life and career

Early life 
Johnson was born on February 1, 1948, in Buffalo, New York, to Mabel (née Sims) and James Ambrose Johnson Sr. He was one of eight children. He was an altar boy and choir member at St. Bridget's Catholic Church. James's father, an autoworker, left the family when James was 10. His mother was a dancer for Katherine Dunham, and later worked as a cleaner in the day, and as a numbers-runner for the Buffalo crime family at night to earn a living. James's mother would take him on her collecting route, and it was in bars where she worked that James saw performers such as John Coltrane, Miles Davis, and Etta James perform. James claimed later, in the autobiography Glow, that he lost his virginity at "age 9 or 10" to a 14-year-old local girl, claiming his "kinky nature came in early." James eventually attended Bennett High School prior to dropping out. James was introduced to drugs at an early age and was arrested for burglary as a young teen. Due to his stints in jail for theft, James entered the United States Navy Reserve at 14 or 15, lying about his age, to avoid the draft. During that time, he also became a drummer for local jazz groups in New York City. Due to his missing his twice-monthly Reserve sessions aboard , he found himself ordered to Vietnam.

Early career 
In 1964, James fled to Toronto. Soon after his arrival three drunk men tried to attack him outside a club; a trio of other men came to his aid. One of them, Levon Helm, was at the time was a member of Ronnie Hawkins' backing band. Helm invited James to their show later that night and he ended up performing onstage with the band. In Toronto, James made friends with local musicians Neil Young and Joni Mitchell. To evade US military authorities, James went under the assumed name "Ricky James Matthews". That same year, James formed The Mynah Birds, a band that produced a fusion of soul, folk and rock music. In 1965, the band briefly recorded for the Canadian division of Columbia Records, releasing a single, "Mynah Bird Hop"/"Mynah Bird Song". At one point, Nick St. Nicholas, later of Steppenwolf fame, was a member; by the time "Mynah Bird Hop" was recorded bassist Bruce Palmer had replaced him. James and Palmer recruited guitarists Tom Morgan and Xavier Taylor and drummer Rick Mason to form a new Mynah Birds lineup, and soon traveled to Detroit to record with Motown. Before the group began recording their first songs for the label, Morgan left, unhappy about the label's attitude toward the musicians. Neil Young eventually took his place. It was while in Detroit that James met his musical heroes, Marvin Gaye and Stevie Wonder. After meeting Wonder and telling him his name, Wonder felt the name "Ricky James Matthews" was "too long" and told James to shorten it to "Ricky James".

In 1966, a financial dispute in Toronto between James and the Mynah Birds' handler, Morley Shelman led to Motown's learning of James's fugitive status with the Navy. Hoping to prevent any scrutiny, Motown execs told Rick they would not be releasing any more of his material and convinced him to come back and work with them after straightening out his legal issues. James surrendered himself to the FBI, and, in May 1966, was sentenced by the Navy to five months' hard labor for unauthorized absence. He was not yet 19 years old. James escaped from the Brooklyn Naval Brig after only six weeks' confinement, but following another six months as a fugitive, surrendered himself a second time. With help from his mother, James found legal assistance from his cousin, future Congressman Louis Stokes, and another attorney, former Marine Captain John Bracken, who pled James's second court-martial down from a potential five years' hard labor to five months. After his release from Portsmouth Naval Prison in August 1967, James returned to Toronto and endured another detention, initially derailing resumption of his career with Mynah Bird bandmate Neil Merryweather, with whom he would later collaborate, first at Motown and then in Los Angeles.

In 1968, again working under the pseudonym Ricky Matthews, James produced and wrote songs at Motown for acts such as The Miracles, Bobby Taylor & the Vancouvers, and The Spinners. According to James, he briefly got involved in pimp activity during this time, but stopped because he felt he was not qualified for it due to the harsh activity and the abuse of women there. It was during this third stint at Motown that James met musician Greg Reeves. Reeves, hoping to find a better situation than the US$38 a week (US$ in  dollars) he was earning as a session bassist for Berry Gordy, joined James, looking to "hitch a lift from Neil Young's rising star," and relocated to Los Angeles.

On one of his first nights in Los Angeles, James was crashing on musician Stephen Stills' couch. When he awoke, he saw a stoned young man sitting on the floor in the lotus position. The man's wrists were bleeding so a scared James sought help. James was later formally introduced to the man who was Jim Morrison, lead singer of the Doors. After the Doors opened for Buffalo Springfield at the Whisky a Go Go, Morrison tricked James into taking acid.

In California, James initially worked as a duo with Greg Reeves, but soon after James introduced Reeves to Neil Young, it was Reeves, not James, who was hired as bassist for the newly formed rock supergroup, Crosby, Stills, Nash & Young. Around this time James formed several versions of the rock band Salt'N'Pepper and got involved with hair stylist Jay Sebring, who agreed to invest in his music. James claimed that in 1969 Sebring invited him to attend a party at actress Sharon Tate’s house, but he was too hungover to get out of bed. The next morning, he discovered that Sebring had been murdered when he saw the Los Angeles Times headline "Sharon Tate, Four Others Murdered."

In 1970, James and Salt'N'Pepper member Ed Roth participated in the recording of Bruce Palmer's solo album The Cycle Is Complete. The duo also recorded as part of the group Heaven and Earth in Toronto. Heaven and Earth eventually changed their name to Great White Cane and recorded a self-titled album for the Los Angeles label Lion Records, released in 1972. James formed another band, Hot Lips, afterwards. He also briefly replaced Mendelson Joe in the Toronto blues band McKenna Mendelson Mainline. During this period, James and Mainline guitarist Mike McKenna co-wrote the song "You Make the Magic", which would later be released by The Chambers Brothers as a B-side to their single "Boogie Children."

Solo career 
In 1973, James signed with A&M Records, where his first single under the name Rick James, "My Mama", was released in 1974, becoming a club hit in Europe.

In 1976, James returned to Buffalo and formed the Stone City Band. Shortly thereafter, he recorded "Get Up and Dance!", his second single to be released. In 1977, James and the Stone City Band signed a contract with Motown's Gordy Records imprint, where they began recording their first album in New York City.

In April 1978, James released his debut solo album, Come Get It!, which included the Stone City Band. The album launched the top 20 hit, "You and I", which became his first number-one R&B hit. The album also included the hit single, "Mary Jane". It eventually sold two million copies, launching James's musical career to stardom, and helping out Motown Records at a time when label fortunes had dwindled. In early 1979, James's second album, Bustin' Out of L Seven, followed the previous album's success, eventually selling a million copies. A third album, Fire It Up, was released in late 1979 going gold. Around that same period, James launched his first headlining tour, the Fire It Up Tour, and agreed to invite the then-upcoming artist, Prince, as well as singer Teena Marie, as his opening act. James had produced Marie's successful Motown debut album, Wild and Peaceful and was featured on the hit duet, "I'm a Sucker (For Your Love)". James was credited with naming Marie, "Lady Tee", on the song, a nickname that stuck with Marie for the rest of her career. The Fire It Up tour led to James developing a bitter rivalry with Prince, after he accused the musician of ripping off his act.

Following the end of the tour in 1980, James released the ballads-heavy Garden of Love, which became his fourth gold record. In 1981, James recorded his best-selling album to date, Street Songs, which like his previous four albums, was a concept album. Street Songs featured a fusion mix of different genres, including rock and new wave, as well as James's brand of crossover funk, enabling James's own style of "punk funk". The album featured hit singles such as "Ghetto Life", the Teena Marie duet "Fire and Desire", "Give It to Me Baby", and his biggest crossover hit to date, "Super Freak", which peaked at number 16 on the Billboard Hot 100 and sold over 1 million copies. Street Songs peaked at number one R&B and number three pop and sold over 3 million copies alone in the United States. Following up that success, James released two more gold albums, 1982's Throwin' Down and 1983's Cold Blooded.

During this period, when Prince also became a success as a producer of other acts including The Time and Vanity 6, James launched the acts Process and the Doo-Rags, and the Mary Jane Girls, featuring his former background singer Joanne "JoJo" McDuffie as the lead vocalist and background performer, finding success with the latter group, due to the hits, "All Night Long", "Candy Man", and "In My House". In 1982, James produced the Temptations' Top 10 R&B hit, "Standing on the Top". In 1983, James recorded the hit duet, "Ebony Eyes", with singer Smokey Robinson, as well as a ballad "Tell Me What You Want" with an introduction by Billy Dee Williams. In 1985, James produced another hit for entertainer Eddie Murphy with the song "Party All the Time". That same year he appeared on an episode of The A-Team with Isaac Hayes. After the release of his ninth solo album, The Flag, in 1986, James signed with Warner Bros. Records, which released the album Wonderful in 1988, featuring the hit, "Loosey's Rap".

James's controversial and provocative image became troublesome sometimes. Famous for promoting the use of marijuana live in concerts during a time that simple possession could lead to a long-term prison sentence, James was often threatened by cops in various cities that he would be arrested if he smoked marijuana on stage during performances of songs such as "Fire It Up" and "Mary Jane". According to Kerry Gordy, most Motown executives erroneously thought the latter song was a "simple cute love song to a girl" not knowing the song was about marijuana.

James's overtly sexual bravado made it tough for him to be a bigger mainstream act. After the debut of the fledgling music video network MTV in August 1981, James tried to present the music video to "Super Freak" to the label, only for the channel to turn the video down. James accused the network of racism. MTV denied this, stating the real reason "Super Freak" was turned down by MTV was because they felt James's video was too vulgar for the channel. When younger artists such as Michael Jackson and Prince found fame on the channel, James accused the two singers of being "tokens" in a 1983 interview, demanding that any black artist that has a video aired on MTV take their video off the channel in protest. James's rant was cosigned by David Bowie, who argued with MTV VJ Mark Goodman about the lack of black artists being featured on the channel despite the successes of Jackson and Prince.

When MTV and BET both avoided playing the video for "Loosey's Rap" because of its graphic sexual content, James considered the networks hypocritical in light of them still playing provocative videos by artists such as Madonna.

Decline 
In 1989, James's 11th album, Kickin', was released only in the UK. By 1990, he had lost his deal with Reprise/Warner Bros., and James began struggling with personal and legal troubles. That year MC Hammer released his hit signature song, "U Can't Touch This", which sampled the prominent opening riff from "Super Freak". James and his co-writer on "Super Freak", Alonzo Miller, sued Hammer for shared songwriting credit and all three received a Grammy Award for Best R&B Song in 1991.

In 1997, James released Urban Rapsody, his first album since his release from prison on assault charges and he toured to promote the album. That year, he discussed his life and career in interviews for the VH1 musical documentary series, Behind the Music, which aired in early 1998. James's musical career slowed again after he suffered a minor stroke during a concert in 1998. He was featured on the song "Love Gravy" with Ike Turner for the 1998 soundtrack album Chef Aid: The South Park Album. James accepted an offer by Eddie Murphy to appear in the comedy-drama Life (1999).

Resurgence

Chappelle's Show
In early 2004, after years out of the spotlight, James participated in a comedy sketch on Chappelle's Show, in a segment called "Charlie Murphy's True Hollywood Stories." James and Murphy recounted humorous stories of their experiences together during the early 1980s. During the sketch, James's character, played by Dave Chappelle, utters the now famous catchphrase, "I'm Rick James, bitch!" The sketches were punctuated by James, explaining his past behavior with the phrase, "Cocaine is a hell of a drug!"

James enjoyed a career revival after his appearance on the show. He supported Teena Marie's tour of her album La Doña and toured with her in May 2004; playing with her at the KBLX Stone Soul Picnic, Pioneer Amphitheatre, Hayward, California. James gave his last public appearance and performance at the fourth annual BET Awards on June 29, 2004. He performed a live rendition of "Fire & Desire" with Teena Marie. James called out a girl backstage who didn't recognize him by saying, "Never mind who you thought I was, I'm Rick James, bitch!" The audience erupted and gave James a standing ovation as he walked off the stage.

Autobiography 
At the time of his death, James was working on an autobiography, The Confessions of Rick James: Memoirs of a Super Freak, as well as a new album. The book was finally published in 2007 by Colossus Books and features a picture of his tombstone. Noted music journalist/biographer David Ritz, who had been employed by James to work on the book with him, later said that this version did not truly reflect how the musician wanted himself portrayed. In 2014, Ritz published his own, re-edited version, Glow: The Autobiography of Rick James.

Documentary 
In 2021, James was the subject of a documentary film ''Bitchin': The Sound and Fury of Rick James'' directed by Sacha Jenkins that was produced and broadcast by Showtime. According to Rotten Tomatoes, the documentary has 100% positive reviews from 13 professional reviewers.

Personal life

Relationships and children
James had two children with Syville Morgan, a former singer and songwriter. They had a daughter, Tyenza, and a son, Rick Jr.

James dated actress Linda Blair from 1982 to 1984. They met after James read an interview where Blair called him sexy. He contacted her and spent time getting to know the actress during a short stint living at the Chateau Marmont in Hollywood. Early in their relationship, Blair became pregnant and had an abortion. James wrote in his memoir, "I loved Linda and it hurt me that she would choose to abort our child without even wanting to talk to me about it first. I still look back on her choice with sadness and wonder about our baby, and how having that child might have changed my life." His hit song "Cold Blooded" was about his relationship with Blair. "It was about how Linda could freeze my blood," he wrote in his memoir.

In 1989, James met 17-year-old party-goer Tanya Hijazi. The two began a romance in 1990. In 1993, the couple had their only child and James's youngest, Tazman. Following their respective releases from prison for assaulting Mary Sauger and Frances Alley, they married in 1996 and divorced in 2002.

James was very close with Teena Marie, whom he met and began collaborating with in 1979. Teena Marie stated they were engaged "for two weeks." Their professional partnership lasted into 2004, when Marie released her comeback album, La Doña, which included her and James's duet "I Got You". When James died, Teena Marie said she was "devastated by his death" and struggled with a painkiller addiction following his passing.

Friendships
James had a close friendship with Eddie Murphy, whom he met in 1981. He was also close to Murphy's older brother Charlie Murphy, who worked as a security guard for his brother. On the Chappelle show skits, Charlie Murphy recalled occasions of mistreatment by James.

James was good friends with actress Debbie Allen. Allen once invited James to a Broadway show and sent a car to pick him up; during the show, James fell asleep due to exhaustion from prior sexual activities. Afterwards, Allen confronted him in the dressing room. She pinned him down and pleaded that he was throwing his life away. "All you do is get high and have sex," she said. He promised to change his ways, but he broke his promise that same night.

James was also a friend of fellow Motown act performers Smokey Robinson and Marvin Gaye, singers James idolized as a teenager. Additionally, he befriended Gaye's second wife, Janis, and he was godfather of Gaye's daughter Nona. James's relationship with Robinson began shortly after James signed with Motown and, in 1983, the duo recorded the hit "Ebony Eyes".

James also idolized former Temptations lead singer David Ruffin and Ruffin's self-proclaimed cousin, bass vocalist Melvin Franklin, and grabbed at the chance to produce the hit "Standing on the Top" for them in 1982. Before that, the then-current lineup of the group recorded background vocals on two James-associated projects—James's Street Songs (singing "Ghetto Life" and "Super Freak") and Teena Marie's It Must Be Magic (singing on the title track). In "Super Freak", "It Must Be Magic", and "Standing on the Top", James famously shouted out, "Temptations, SING!"

Substance abuse and health problems
James's substance abuse began in his teens, first with marijuana and heroin. He began using cocaine in the late 1960s. His cocaine addiction increased by the 1980s, and he began freebasing by the end of the decade. When he smoked crack cocaine in his Beverly Hills mansion, he often put aluminum foil on the windows to block onlookers. Although James claimed that he quit cocaine when he entered prison, his autopsy showed there was a small amount of the substance in his bloodstream at the time of his death.

His drug use led to major health problems. In April 1984, he was hospitalized after being found unconscious at his house by a friend. In 1998, James suffered a stroke after a blood vessel ruptured in his neck during a concert at Mile High Stadium in Denver. Earlier that year he had hip replacement surgery to repair bone damage "from jumping around on stage and substance abuse."

Kidnapping and assault convictions
By the 1990s, James's drug abuse was public knowledge. He was heavily addicted to cocaine and later admitted to spending about $7,000 per week for five years straight. On August 2, 1991, James and his girlfriend Tanya Hijazi were arrested on charges of holding 24-year-old Frances Alley hostage for up to six days, tying her up, forcing her to perform sexual acts, and burning her legs and abdomen with the hot end of a crack cocaine pipe during a week-long cocaine binge. James faced a maximum sentence of life in prison if convicted on all charges, which included assault with a deadly weapon, aggravated mayhem, torture, forcible oral copulation, false imprisonment and kidnapping.

On November 3, 1992, while out on bail for that incident, James, under the influence of cocaine, assaulted music executive Mary Sauger at the St. James Club and Hotel in West Hollywood. Sauger claims she met James and Hijazi for a business meeting, but said the two then kidnapped and beat her over a 20-hour period.

James was found guilty of both offenses but was cleared of a torture charge that could have put him in prison for the rest of his life. While serving his five-year sentence at Folsom Prison, James lost a civil suit to Sauger, who was awarded nearly $2 million in damages in 1994. James was ordered to pay her about $1 million; the hotel and a private security firm were found liable for nearly $750,000 in damages due to negligence. James was released from prison on August 21, 1996, after serving more than two years.

In 1998, James was accused of sexually assaulting a 26-year-old woman, but the charges were later dropped. In 2020, James's estate was sued for $50 million by a woman who accused him of raping her when she was 15 years old at a group home for troubled youths in Buffalo, New York in 1979. The suit was later dismissed.

Death

On the morning of August 6, 2004, James's caretaker found him dead in his Los Angeles home at the Oakwood Toluca Hills apartment complex, just outside Burbank. He was 56 years old. His longtime publicist, Sujata Murthy, released a statement to the media stating he died of natural causes. James died from pulmonary failure and cardiac failure, associated with his various health conditions of diabetes, a stroke, pacemaker, and heart attack. His autopsy found alprazolam (Xanax), diazepam, bupropion (Wellbutrin), citalopram (Celexa), hydrocodone, digoxin (Digitalis), chlorpheniramine, methamphetamine and cocaine in his blood. However, the coroner stated that "none of the drugs or drug combinations were found to be at levels that were life-threatening in and of themselves".

Following a public viewing for fans, a private memorial was held at Forest Lawn Memorial Park - Hollywood Hills. A public funeral was held at St. John Baptist Church in Buffalo, New York on Saturday, Aug. 14, 2004, with an estimated 6000 fans attending the viewing, and cremation following the service; a free tribute concert took place later that day in Martin Luther King Park. James was buried at the Forest Lawn Cemetery in Buffalo.

Accolades
James received the following honors:
 1982: American Music Award for Favorite Soul/R&B Album (Street Songs)
 1996: Inducted into the Buffalo Music Hall of Fame.

Grammy Awards 
James was nominated for three Grammy Awards, winning one as a co-writer for MC Hammer's song "U Can't Touch This".

|-
| 1982
| "Super Freak"
| Grammy Award for Best Rock Vocal Performance, Male
| 
|-
| 1982
| "Street Songs"
| Best R&B Vocal Performance, Male
| 
|-
| 1991
| "U Can't Touch This"
| Grammy Award for Best R&B Song
|

Discography
James's entire Motown Records back catalogue was released in 2014 on iTunes for the first time in digitally remastered form. This marks the first time many of his albums have been widely available since their initial releases. Physical copies of James's albums, namely Fire It Up, Garden of Love and The Flag, have become rare and highly sought after by fans.

Studio albums
 Come Get It! (with The Stone City Band, 1978)
 Bustin' Out of L Seven (1979)
 Fire It Up (1979)
 Garden of Love (1980)
 Street Songs (1981)
 Throwin' Down (1982)
 Cold Blooded (1983)
 Glow (1985)
 The Flag (1986)
 Wonderful (1988)
 Kickin' (1989)
 Urban Rapsody (1997)
 Rick James Forever (2005)
 Deeper Still (2007)

References

Bibliography

External links
  – official site
 
 
 Rick James, The Mynah Birds and Neil Young
 Rise & Fall of a Super Freak

1948 births
2004 deaths
20th-century American bass guitarists
20th-century American keyboardists
A&M Records artists
African-American Catholics
African-American guitarists
20th-century African-American male singers
African-American record producers
African-American rock singers
African-American male singer-songwriters
American expatriate musicians in Canada
American funk bass guitarists
American funk guitarists
American funk keyboardists
American funk singers
American kidnappers
American male bass guitarists
American people convicted of assault
American people convicted of drug offenses
American prisoners and detainees
American rhythm and blues bass guitarists
American rhythm and blues guitarists
American rhythm and blues keyboardists
American rhythm and blues singer-songwriters
American soul guitarists
American soul keyboardists
American soul singers
Burials at Forest Lawn Cemetery (Buffalo)
Cocaine-related deaths in California
Culture of Buffalo, New York
Deaths from diabetes
Grammy Award winners
Guitarists from New York (state)
Motown artists
Musicians from Buffalo, New York
Prisoners and detainees of California
Prisoners and detainees of the United States military
Record producers from New York (state)
Reprise Records artists
Singer-songwriters from New York (state)
United States Navy sailors
African-American United States Navy personnel
American record producers